Thecomyia is a Neotropical genus of flies in the family Sciomyzidae, the marsh flies or snail-killing flies.

Species
T. abercrombiei Marinoni & Steyskal, 2003
T. autazensis Marinoni & Steyskal, 2003
T. bonattoi Marinoni & Steyskal, 2003
T. chrysacra Marinoni & Steyskal, 2003
T. diederiki Mortelmans, 2018
T. lateralis (Walker, 1858)
T. limbata (Wiedemann, 1819)
T. longicornis Perty, 1833
T. mathisi Marinoni & Steyskal, 2003
T. naponica Marinoni & Steyskal, 2003
T. papaveroi Marinoni & Steyskal, 2003
T. signorelli Marinoni & Steyskal, 2003
T. tricuneata Marinoni & Steyskal, 2003

References

Sciomyzidae
Sciomyzoidea genera